This is a list of Dutch television related events from 2008.

Events
1 March - Nikki Kerkhof wins the fourth series of Idols.
30 May - 14-year-old contortionist Daniëlle Bubberman wins the first series of Holland's Got Talent.

Debuts
28 March - Holland's Got Talent (2008–present)

Television shows

1950s
NOS Journaal (1956–present)

1970s
Sesamstraat (1976–present)

1980s
Jeugdjournaal (1981–present)
Het Klokhuis (1988–present)

1990s
Goede tijden, slechte tijden (1990–present)
De Club van Sinterklaas (1999-2009)

2000s
Dancing with the Stars (2005-2009)
X Factor (2006–present)

Ending this year
Idols (2002-2008, 2016–present)

Births

Deaths

See also
 2008 in the Netherlands